Michel van Rijt (born June 25, 1970 in Helmond, Netherlands) is a martial artist.

Results 
His most important titles are:
 3rd place at Dutch military judo championships, - 71 kg (1990)
 3rd place in World Championships Ju-Jitsu, - 69 kg (1998)
 3rd place in World Championships Ju-Jitsu, - 77 kg (2000)

References

1970 births
Living people
Dutch jujutsuka
Dutch practitioners of Brazilian jiu-jitsu
Dutch male judoka
Dutch male karateka
Dutch male kickboxers
Pankration practitioners
Silat practitioners
Mixed martial arts trainers
Dutch expatriate sportspeople in Russia
Sportspeople from Helmond
Competitors at the 2001 World Games
World Games silver medalists
20th-century Dutch people